Kathy Staff (born Minnie Higginbottom; 12 July 1928 – 13 December 2008) was an English actress known for her work on British television. She is best known for her portrayal of Nora Batty in Last of the Summer Wine, the longest running sitcom in the world.

Career

Early career
She began her acting career with touring repertory companies in 1946, changing her name to Katherine Brant. After she married John Staff in 1951, she adopted the surname as her stage name, hence Kathy Staff. She retired from the stage at this point to raise her family, but started working as an extra for Granada Television in Manchester in the 1960s. In her autobiography, Staff revealed herself to be a Conservative, and noted that she had once stood as an election candidate for the party. This appears to have been in 1971, when a Ms. M. Staff contested the Central ward in the Municipal Borough of Dukinfield. The seat was comfortably held by Labour, with the Liberals beating all three Conservative candidates, the last-placed of whom was Staff.

Last of the Summer Wine
Staff was best known for her role as one of the main characters, Nora Batty, in the long-running BBC sitcom Last of the Summer Wine. She played Nora Batty from the pilot episode in 1973  until 2008, the year she died from a brain tumour, totalling 245 episodes.

Shortly after the death of actor Bill Owen on 12 July 1999, coincidentally also Staff's birthday, Staff left the show briefly. She stated in interviews that things just were not the same since his passing, and her heart was no longer in it. She would later return to the show and remain until she died in 2008.

Television

Staff had a regular role as Doris Luke in the popular ATV soap opera, Crossroads from 1978 to 1984 and 2001 to 2002. Her other television roles included Coronation Street as Vera Hopkins, No Frills as Molly Bickerstaff, Open All Hours as Mrs Blewitt, Dawson's Weekly and The Benny Hill Show. She appeared in a television version of Separate Tables in 1983.

She was the subject of This Is Your Life in 1984 when she was surprised by Eamonn Andrews while shopping in Harrods. She also appeared on Lily Savage's Blankety Blank, plus a brief appearance in Follyfoot.

Theatre
Her theatre roles included Lady Bracknell in The Importance of Being Earnest at Birmingham Rep, Madame Arcati and Mrs Malaprop in touring productions of Blithe Spirit and The Rivals respectively and a touring production of the comedy Sailor, Beware!, as well as two West End plays: the farce Two into One and comedy When We Are Married, and many pantomimes.

Films
She appeared in A Kind of Loving (1962) as Thora Hird's neighbour, as well as The Family Way (1966), The Dresser (1983), Camille (1984), Little Dorrit (1988), and Mary Reilly (1996).

Illness and death
She died on 13 December 2008 at the Willow Wood Hospice in Ashton-under-Lyne, at the age of 80, with her husband John at her bedside, after a brain tumour was diagnosed earlier in the year. Her death was announced on 14 December.
Her funeral took place at St Mark's Church, Dukinfield, where she was a lifelong member and sang in the choir. She is commemorated in a memorial screen at the church.

Television roles

References

Further reading

External links
 
 
 Obituary in The Times. Retrieved 2008-12-15
 Obituary in The Independent

1928 births
2008 deaths
People from Dukinfield
20th-century English actresses
21st-century English actresses
English film actresses
English stage actresses
English soap opera actresses
English television actresses
Deaths from brain cancer in England
Actresses from Cheshire
British comedy actresses